The 2014 Sky Blue FC season was the team's fifth season of existence. Sky Blue played the 2014 season in National Women's Soccer League, the top tier of women's soccer in the United States.

Background
The foundation of the National Women's Soccer League was announced on November 21, 2012, with Sky Blue FC selected as a host for one of the eight teams.

Match results

Regular season

Standings

Results summary

Results by round

Team

Roster

Squad statistics
Key to positions: FW – Forward, MF – Midfielder, DF – Defender, GK – Goalkeeper

Honors and awards

NWSL Awards

NWSL Yearly Awards

See also
 2014 National Women's Soccer League season
 2014 in American soccer

References

Sky Blue FC
Sky Blue FC
NJ/NY Gotham FC seasons
Sky Blue FC